The 1950 Cleveland Indians season was the 50th season in franchise history. The team finished fourth in the American League with a record of 92–62, six games behind the New York Yankees.

Offseason 
 December 5, 1949: Grant Dunlap was drafted from the Indians by the St. Louis Browns in the 1949 minor league draft.
 February 17, 1950: Satchel Paige was released by the Indians.

Regular season 
In 1950, the Cleveland Indians became the first Major League Baseball franchise to use a bullpen car. Rookie Al Rosen led the American League in home runs with 37.

Season standings

Record vs. opponents

Notable transactions 
 April 3, 1950: Mike Tresh was released by the Indians.
 May 11, 1950: Grant Dunlap was returned to the Indians by the St. Louis Browns.
 June 14, 1950: Mickey Vernon was traded by the Indians to the Washington Senators for Dick Weik.

Roster

Player stats

Batting

Starters by position 
Note: Pos = Position; G = Games played; AB = At bats; H = Hits; Avg. = Batting average; HR = Home runs; RBI = Runs batted in

Other batters 
Note: G = Games played; AB = At bats; H = Hits; Avg. = Batting average; HR = Home runs; RBI = Runs batted in

Pitching

Starting pitchers 
Note: G = Games pitched; IP = Innings pitched; W = Wins; L = Losses; ERA = Earned run average; SO = Strikeouts

Other pitchers 
Note: G = Games pitched; IP = Innings pitched; W = Wins; L = Losses; ERA = Earned run average; SO = Strikeouts

Relief pitchers 
Note: G = Games pitched; W = Wins; L = Losses; SV = Saves; ERA = Earned run average; SO = Strikeouts

Awards and honors 
 Al Rosen, American League leader, home runs (37)

Farm system 

LEAGUE CHAMPIONS: Wilkes-Barre

References

External links
1950 Cleveland Indians season at Baseball Reference

Cleveland Indians seasons
Cleveland Indians season
Cleveland Indians